Jeanpierre is a surname. Tt may refer to:

 Christian Jeanpierre (born 1965), French journalist
 Julien Jeanpierre (born 1980), French tennis player
 Lemuel Jeanpierre (born 1987), American football player and coach
 Pierre Jeanpierre (1912–1958), French Army officer